Karnataka State Handicrafts Development Corporation is an agency of Government of Karnataka established in 1964 to develop, preserve and promote the rich tradition of exquisite craftsmanship of Karnataka state.

References

State agencies of Karnataka
Culture of Karnataka
1964 establishments in Mysore State
State handicrafts development corporations of India
Government agencies established in 1964